Peter Altmeier (12 August 1899 – 28 August 1977) was a German politician (Zentrum, later CDU). From 1947 to 1969, he was the Minister President of Rhineland-Palatinate. He served as the President of the Bundesrat in 1954/55 and 1965/66. He was born in Saarbrücken and died in Koblenz. He was the longest governing German Minister-President in one single state—longest at all was Bernhard Vogel.

External links 
 Peter Altmeier
 Die rheinland-pfälzischen Landesregierungen
 Video files

1899 births
1977 deaths
People from Saarbrücken
People from the Rhine Province
Presidents of the German Bundesrat
Centre Party (Germany) politicians
Christian Democratic Union of Germany politicians
Members of the Landtag of Rhineland-Palatinate
Cartellverband members
German military personnel of World War I
Grand Crosses 1st class of the Order of Merit of the Federal Republic of Germany
Recipients of the Saarland Order of Merit
Ministers-President of Rhineland Palatinate
State ministers of Rhineland-Palatinate